Bigger Than the Sky is a 2005 American drama film directed by Al Corley, written by  Rodney Patrick Vaccaro, and starring Marcus Thomas, John Corbett, Amy Smart, Sean Astin, Clare Higgins, and Patty Duke. Its plot follows a man, who after breaking up with his girlfriend, auditions for a local community theatre production of Cyrano de Bergerac.

Plot
After being rejected by his girlfriend, Peter Rooker, an art-department employee in Portland, Oregon, decides to audition for a small role in an upcoming local community theatre's production of Cyrano de Bergerac. Despite the fact that Peter has no experience or skill as an actor, the director casts Peter as Cyrano, as the lead. Peter soon becomes caught up in the various intrigues of the "theater people", including the charming but mercurial Michael Degan, the beautiful leading lady Grace Hargrove, and a cast of other eccentric players. Gradually, Peter discovers that in the world of theater, the normal rules do not apply, but in the end, everyone has a role. As Peter struggles with his acting,  clearly he is not going to be ready for opening night.

An experienced, but universally disliked actor, Ken Zorbell, is brought in to play Cyrano. Realizing the writing is on the wall, Peter asks the director to let him relinquish the role and take another role as a background character. On opening night, the lead has not appeared, and the director asks Peter, who has never rehearsed the role, to play Cyrano. At first, he declines, but then realizing it is his dream, he plays Cyrano with great success.

Cast

Production
The film was shot on location in Portland, Oregon.

Release
The film received a limited release on February 18, 2005, opening in New York City; Los Angeles; Atlanta; Portland, Oregon; Austin, Texas; and Minneapolis.

Critical response
Writing for The Village Voice, Ed Park noted that the film "lopes along endlessly, a no-surprises foray into backstage high-jinks and the notion of life as the best acting coach there is." Anita Gates of The New York Times wrote: "The surprising thing about Bigger Than the Sky is its touching ending. A colleague has died, and the company gathers to honor him in an inventive, life-affirming way. Finally, it becomes clear that Mr. Corley's film is meant to be a tribute to the love of theater. It has just been posing as the story of one man's finding himself." Marc Savlov of The Austin Chronicle awarded the film only a half star out of five, writing: "Bigger Than the Sky feels constrained by its unshakable predisposition toward actorly fawning. This film is so enamored of theatre folk and their lusty lot that you want to slap it about the face and neck and force it to go endure the inevitable hip-hop take on Beckett's existential yawn."

References

External links

2005 films
2005 independent films
2005 romantic comedy films
American romantic comedy films
Coquette Productions films
Films about actors
Films about theatre
Films based on Cyrano de Bergerac (play)
Films set in Portland, Oregon
Films shot in Portland, Oregon
Metro-Goldwyn-Mayer films
2000s English-language films
2000s American films